Troy M. Stedman (born May 19, 1965 in Cedar Falls, Iowa) is a former National Football League outside linebacker who was drafted 170th overall by the Kansas City Chiefs in the seventh round of the 1988 NFL Draft. He attended Washburn University in Topeka, Kansas and Iowa Central Community College. He was the third Ichabod to ever be drafted in the NFL.

References

External links
NFL.com player page

1965 births
Living people
American football linebackers
Kansas City Chiefs players
Washburn Ichabods football players
Iowa Central Tritons football players
People from Cedar Falls, Iowa
Raleigh–Durham Skyhawks players
Players of American football from Iowa